Brookesia thieli, commonly also known as Domergue's leaf chameleon or Thiel's pygmy chameleon, is a species of lizard in the family Chamaeleonidae. The species is endemic to eastern Madagascar, with a type locality of Ambodimanga, Andapa. It was first described in 1969 by Édouard-Raoul Brygoo and Charles Antoine Domergue, and it was ranked by the International Union for Conservation of Nature as "least concern".

Etymology
The specific name, thieli, is in honor of French botanist Jean Thiel, who is an expert on tropical forests.

Distribution and habitat
B. thieli is found in eastern Madagascar, and its type locality is Ambodimanga, Madagascar. Its preferred natural habitat is forest.

Reproduction
B. thieli is oviparous.

Taxonomy
Brookesia thieli was first described in 1969 by Brygoo and Domergue. The same species was also described as Brookesia antoetrae by Brygoo and Domergue in 1971.  Brookesia antoetrae was synonymized with Brookesia thieli by Raxworthy and Nussbaum in 1995, but not all subsequent authors have accepted this conclusion.

References

Further reading
Brygoo É-R, Domergue CA (1969). "Notes sur les Brookesia de Madagascar. II. Un Brookesia des forêts orientales de Madagascar, B. thieli n. sp.". Bulletin du Muséum national d'Histoire naturelle, Paris 40 (6): 1103–1109. (Brookesia thieli, new species). (in French).
Glaw F, Vences M (2007). A Field Guide to the Amphibians and Reptiles of Madagascar, Third Edition. Cologne, Germany: Vences & Glaw Verlag. 496 pp. .
Nečas P (1999). Chameleons: Nature's hidden jewels. Frankfurt am Main, Germany: Edition Chimaira. 348 pp.  (Europe),  (USA, Canada). (Brookesia thieli, p. 273).

T
Endemic fauna of Madagascar
Reptiles of Madagascar
Reptiles described in 1969
Taxa named by Édouard-Raoul Brygoo
Taxa named by Charles Domergue